The Punta Gorda Ice Plant (also known as the Kazwells Furniture Store) is a historic ice plant in Punta Gorda, Florida, United States. It is located at 408 Tamiami Trail. Currently, it houses a pub and pizzeria. It was added to the National Register of Historic Places in 1990.

See also
Punta Gorda Fish Company Ice House

References

External links

 Charlotte County listings at National Register of Historic Places
 Florida's Office of Cultural and Historical Programs
 Charlotte County listings

Punta Gorda, Florida
National Register of Historic Places in Charlotte County, Florida
Ice trade